The Philip A. Hart Senate Office Building is the third U.S. Senate office building, and is located on 2nd Street NE between Constitution Avenue NE and C Street NE in Washington, D.C., in the United States. Construction began in January 1975, and it was first occupied in November 1982. Rapidly rising construction costs plagued the building, creating several scandals. The structure is named for Philip Hart, who served 18 years as a senator from Michigan. Accessed via a spur of the United States Capitol Subway System, the building features a nine-story atrium dominated by massive artwork, and a large Central Hearing Facility which provides television facilities as well as extensive seating.

Design and construction
The Dirksen Senate Office Building was intended to occupy the entire block bounded by 1st Street NE, Constitution Avenue NE, 2nd Street NE, and C Street NE.  However, due to the resource and financial demands of the Korean War, the building was scaled back and occupied only the western half of this area.

In 1969, Congress voted to acquire the eastern half of the block for a "New Senate Office Building". Originally, the Senate intended only to build a $21 million ($ in  dollars) underground parking garage here. That effort was approved in June 1971. But in May 1972, the Subcommittee on Buildings of the Senate Committee on Public Works approved a plan to construct the New Senate Office Building above the parking garage. The building's cost was estimated at $48 million ($ in  dollars) in June 1972. The full Senate approved the building plan in September 1972, but by then the building's estimated cost had risen to $53.5 million ($ in  dollars).

In April 1973, the Architect of the Capitol awarded the architectural design contract to John Carl Warnecke, a nationally prominent architect working in the District of Columbia who had helped save Lafayette Square and designed the John F. Kennedy grave site. Warnecke's design for the building was approved by the Senate Committee on Public Works on August 8, 1974. Warnecke was given just two weeks to come up with the cost estimate, which the Architect of the Capitol later claimed was far too little time to generate an accurate cost forecast. By the end of the year, the estimated cost of construction had risen to $69 million.

Ground for the new structure was broken in January 1975, and by the time ground clearance began in April the building's cost had risen to $84 million ($ in  dollars). The poor and uneven condition of the soil at the site caused delays in the excavation, and major cost increases. When the foundations were finished, it was discovered that many of the anchoring bolts were misaligned and had to be replaced. This also added extensive new costs to the project.

On August 30, 1976, the Senate voted to name the new office building the Philip A. Hart Senate Office Building in honor of retiring Senator Philip Hart (D-Michigan). Hart died on December 26, 1976, of melanoma, having declined to run for reelection the previous November.

By August 1978, actual construction costs were now $85 million ($ in  dollars) and were expected to top $122 million ($ in  dollars). The Senate approved a plan to spend another $54 million ($ in  dollars) on the structure, and cap costs at $135 million ($ in  dollars).  Initially, the House approved this plan. But when constituents bitterly complained, the House reversed itself on both counts. By 1979, construction estimates had soared to $179 million ($ in  dollars), and the General Accounting Office said it would rise to $230 million ($ in  dollars) without changes. In July 1979, the Senate agreed to cap costs at $137.7 million ($ in  dollars) after an acrimonious three-hour debate during which some senators suggested the building be torn down. The Architect of the Capitol ordered changes in the design to keep construction costs under the $137.7 million cap. These included elimination of a penthouse-level dining room, $906,000 ($ in  dollars) in furnishings for an interior gymnasium, oak paneling for each senator's office, dimmer switches for lights, a $400,000 ($ in  dollars) art gallery, $227,000 ($ in  dollars) in carpeting for auxiliary space, $167,700 ($ in  dollars) for vertical blinds, and $1.2 million  ($ in  dollars) for finishes and furnishings for a large central hearing room with hidden multimedia bays.

The Hart Senate Office Building was completed in September 1982 at a cost of $137.7 million ($ in  dollars). The Architect of the Capitol argued that the significantly higher costs of the Hart Senate Office building were due to the unexpected excavation issues, the foundation construction errors, Senate-ordered changes, high inflation, and some mismanagement of the construction project. Architect of the Capitol George M. White argued the construction cost was a reasonable $110 per square foot. Warnecke dismissed allegations about Senate-ordered changes, saying these increased costs just 2 percent, and said that construction alone was just $107 million ($ in  dollars) (with another $28 million ($ in  dollars) coming from administrative costs, fees, and furnishings). He argued that excellent construction management held inflation in construction costs to just 67 percent, and that the building was erected at a cost of $97 per square foot, "well below the costs of any other major public building built in the District during that period." However, the American Institute of Architects said commercial construction costs in Washington, D.C., ranged from $54 to $65 per square foot, and The Christian Science Monitor reported the cost of the building at $137.70 per square foot.

The building was first occupied on November 22, 1982. The structure contained offices for 50 senators, but 25 of them refused to move into the structure. To save costs, the building gave each person a cubicle, rather than an office, which greatly upset Senate staff. To resolve the issue, junior senators (not normally able to choose which offices they wanted, nor obtain spacious and well-equipped ones) were able to claim the large, modern offices in the Hart Senate Office Building.

In late 1982, the Senate found $9.5 million ($ in  dollars) in unused funds, which it designated to pay for the modular furniture and partitions for use in the Hart building.

Structure

The Hart Senate Office Building consists of nine above-ground stories.

Instead of the Neoclassical architectural style of the Dirksen and Russell Senate Office Buildings, the Hart Senate Office Building is Modernist. To fit within the context provided by the Dirksen and Russell buildings, Hart's building lines were designed to mesh with those of the earlier structures and the new building clad in dazzlingly white marble from Vermont.

To echo the courtyards of Dirksen and Russell, the Hart building has an atrium covered by a vast skylight. The walls of the interior of the structure, including the atrium, are clad in the same white Vermont marble as the exterior. The atrium's floor, however, is rose-colored Tennessee marble. Walkways on the interior of the atrium provide access to each office suite.

The public entrance to each suite is on an odd-numbered floor, with private staff entrances on even-numbered floors. Due to the building's layout, a workspace with identical ceilings and views is adjacent to each senator's office. Workspace elsewhere in the suite exists on a main floor and a mezzanine, connected by an internal stairs. All workspace is generally free of columns and walls. A partition system consisting of oak frames covered in sound-absorbent fabric, designed and manufactured by Acoustical Screen Corporation, was designed for use in providing a flexible partition system in each office. These partitions were originally purchased for only a handful of offices, due to cutbacks in the building's furnishing budget. Each office also has a private restroom.

Manhole covers in the sidewalks and streets nearby were made of bronze, to avoid unsightly rust stains from traditional iron manhole covers (the usual material). The interior elevator doors were also cast in bronze, and areas in the floors in suites, meeting rooms, and some public areas had removable panels and built-in tubing which allowed for the easy replacement or upgrading of electrical, telecommunications, and computer wiring. The cafeteria beneath the Dirksen Senate Office Building was doubled in size and extended beneath the Hart building, which allowed the public to use for the first time during lunch hours.

The structure's $137 million cost did not include furnishing, which Senate experts estimated would cost another $32.6 million ($ in  dollars). Unspecified changes made by Warnecke led to $4.2 million ($ in  dollars) in cost savings, however. These allowed certain items to be restored, such as the large hearing room, auxiliary area carpeting, vertical blinds, and the gymnasium equipment (now estimated to cost just $736,000 ($ in  dollars)). The cost savings also allowed the Architect of the Capitol to build a tennis court on the building's roof.

Below the structure is a 350-car parking garage.

The building's design deliberately spared the adjacent Sewall–Belmont house, a historic structure that serves as headquarters for the National Woman's Party and a museum about the women's suffrage movement.

Central Hearing Facility

The Central Hearing Facility was completed in October 1987, and used for the first time in January 1988. Located on the second floor of the Hart Senate Office Building, the two-story high room has studio-quality television lighting built into the ceiling. Booths built into the sides of the room are elevated and can accommodate television camera crews. Above them are glassed-in booths where television reporters and news presenters can report from without disturbing the proceedings below.

The Central Hearing Facility is lavishly paneled and has a stone backdrop behind the dais.

Public access to the Central Hearing Facility is controlled via two foyers, accessible from the public hallways. Privately, members of Congress, their staff, and often witnesses access the hearing room from nondescript doors on the second floor of the Dirksen Senate Office Building. A small "green room", hidden behind the back wall of the Central Hearing Facility, provides a waiting room and space for individuals to prepare before entering the main hearing room.

Subway access
A spur of the United States Capitol Subway System was constructed to connect the Hart Senate Office Building to the subway's main track beneath the Dirksen Senate Office Building. The spur opened when the new building did. In 1989, the Senate approved a plan to upgrade the subway beneath the Hart and Dirksen office buildings. The changes included four new cars capable of seating 25 people (up from 18), making platforms and cars wheelchair-accessible, and automating these cars (eliminating the need for car conductors). The changes were expected to produce savings of $122,000 ($ in  dollars) a year and cut waiting times to two minutes from four. Transportation Group Inc., of Orlando, Florida, was paid $15.8 million ($ in  dollars) and the Architect of the Capitol received $2 million ($ in  dollars) to design and manufacture the new subway cars and system. The system was finished in 1994.

Atrium
The skylight is actually 18 separate skylights, each of which has nine panels. A four-globe light fixture is suspended from each skylight. Each light fixture has an electric motor which can lower the fixture to the lobby floor so that bulbs can be replaced.

Beginning in 2014, major renovations and repairs were made to the roof of the Hart building. The roof had reached the end of its life and was replaced. The skylights, which leaked extensively and were causing damage to the building, were also replaced. To enhance the building's energy efficiency, solar panels capable of generating 148 kilowatts of solar power were installed on the roof. The entire roof project cost about $11.3 million ($ in  dollars).

Mountains and Clouds

The atrium is dominated by the sculptural work Mountains and Clouds by Alexander Calder. The upper part of the work consists of a mobile, "Clouds", made from curved aluminum plates suspended from the roof on a shaft. Crystallization Systems, Inc. of New York manufactured the mobile. A computer-controlled motor moves the mobile.

The lower part of the work consists of a stabile made of four flat, triangular-shaped steel plates painted matte black and supported by two curving legs. The Segré Foundry of Waterbury, Connecticut, manufactured the stabile.

Mountains and Clouds was the last work Calder completed. He was in Washington, D.C., on November 10, 1976, to show the finalized maquette to Architect of the Capitol George White. White gave his approval for the full-size work to be installed at the Hart Senate Office Building. Calder flew to his daughter's home in New York, and died of a heart attack at 6:00 AM on November 11.

During the budget battles in 1979 over the cost of the Hart Senate Office Building, funds for completion of the Calder work were deleted. But Senator Nicholas F. Brady, who had been appointed to serve out the unexpired term of Senator Harrison A. Williams (who had resigned on March 11, 1982, after his bribery conviction in the Abscam scandal), decided in June 1982 to establish the Capitol Art Foundation.  The foundation's goal was to raise funds for the placement of art through the United States Capitol Complex. By June 1985, the foundation had raised $250,000 ($ in  dollars) to manufacture and $400,000 ($ in  dollars) to install Mountains and Clouds. Most of the money came from billionaire art collector Paul Mellon and C. Douglas Dillon. The work was dedicated in a ceremony held on May 5, 1987.

Some time after the installation of the work, the motor malfunctioned and the mobile portion of Mountains and Clouds stopped rotating. When this happened is unclear, with one source saying shortly after the work's installation and another saying about 2005. In 2015, Senator Chris Murphy began a fundraising effort to restore the mobile to operation.

Mountains and Clouds is considered a one-of-a-kind work, as it is the only work by Calder to combine a mobile and a stabile. "He had mounted the forms atop one another before, but had never used them separately in a single piece as he anticipated to do with moving clouds and stationary mountains," says Capitol Hill reporter Justin Cox.

After the 2011 Virginia earthquake, there were concerns that the mobile might have become unsafe. It was lowered to the ground in 2014, and a complete safety check of the work conducted. It was restored to its suspended position in 2015.

Anthrax attack
On October 15, 2001, several suites of this building became contaminated by the release of anthrax powder from an envelope mailed to Senate Majority Leader Tom Daschle in the 2001 anthrax attacks. The building was closed October 17, 2001, displacing hundreds of Senate staff. The building was decontaminated using chlorine dioxide gas from November to December 2001, and the building reopened January 23, 2002.

Committee offices
As of 2016, three Senate committees had offices located inside Hart Senate Office Building:
United States Senate Committee on Indian Affairs
United States Senate Select Committee on Ethics
United States Senate Select Committee on Intelligence

List of current U.S. senators in the Hart Senate Office Building

References
Notes

Citations

External links

 C-SPAN American History TV tour of the Hart Senate Office Building with Senate Historian Emeritus Don Ritchie 
 

Congressional office buildings
Government buildings completed in 1982
1980s architecture in the United States
1982 establishments in Washington, D.C.